Jasmuiža Manor is a manor in Aizkalne Parish, Preiļi Municipality in the historical region of Latgale, in Latvia, currently a writer's home museum dedicated to Rainis.

History
Construction of the wooden manor house near Aizkalne began in 1883 and was completed in 1891. The building now houses a museum open on 16 August 1964,  dedicated to the Latvian writer Rainis whose father, Krišjānis Pliekšāns, managed the surrounding estate.

See also
List of palaces and manor houses in Latvia

References

External links
  Rainis Museum "Jasmuiža"

Manor houses in Latvia
Biographical museums in Latvia
Literary museums in Latvia
1964 establishments in Latvia
Preiļi Municipality